Midwest emo (or Midwestern emo) refers to the emo scene and/or subgenre that developed in 1990s Midwestern United States. Employing unconventional vocal stylings, distinct guitar riffs and arpeggiated melodies, Midwest emo bands shifted away from the genre's hardcore punk roots and drew on indie rock and math rock approaches. According to the author and critic Andy Greenwald, "this was the period when emo earned many, if not all, of the stereotypes that have lasted to this day: boy-driven, glasses-wearing, overly sensitive, overly brainy, chiming-guitar-driven college music." Midwest emo is sometimes used interchangeably with "second-wave emo". Although implied by the name, Midwest emo does not solely refer to bands and artists from the Midwestern United States, and the style is played by outfits across the United States and internationally.

Characteristics
According to The Chicago Reader critic Leor Galil, the second-wave bands of the Midwest emo scene "transformed the angular fury of D.C. emo into something malleable, melodic, and cathartic—its common features included cycling guitar parts, chugging bass lines, and unconventional singing that sounded like a sweet neighbor kid with no vocal training but plenty of heart." Incorporating elements from indie rock, the genre also features "gloomy chord progressions" and arpeggiated guitar melodies. Midwest emo is also commonly associated with the use of math rock elements.

The definable traits of the Midwest emo have proven to be easily fused with other genres of underground independent music. Revival bands including The World Is a Beautiful Place & I Am No Longer Afraid to Die mixed the Midwestern emo sound with genres such as post-rock and orchestral music. Other outfits, including Patterns Make Sunrise, The Pennikurvers, and Everyone Asked About You, introduced elements of twee pop and indie pop into the sound of Midwest emo. This proved influential to the aforementioned Emo revival scene, with groups like Dowsing and Empire! Empire! (I Was a Lonely Estate) taking a similar approach.

History

The Midwest emo scene came into prominence in the mid-1990s with bands such as American Football, Chamberlain, The Promise Ring, Cap'n Jazz, Cursive,  Mineral and The Get Up Kids. Braid has been regarded as an important act to propel the Midwest emo sound across the United States. Some of the acts to practice the sound were originally not from the Midwestern United States, with Sunny Day Real Estate being from Washington and Mineral being from Texas.

Midwest emo saw a notable resurgence over the late 2000s with labels such as Count Your Lucky Stars Records, as well as by bands such as CSTVT, Oliver Houston, Into It. Over It., Algernon Cadwallader and Snowing.

See also
 Math rock
 Midwestern United States
 Post-rock

References

Further reading
 

Emo
1990s in music
Alternative rock genres
Culture of the Midwestern United States
Indie rock
2010s in music
20th-century music genres
21st-century music genres